Michael E. Levine (Born New York, NY, United States) was a "Distinguished Research Scholar" at the New York University School of Law. He was involved in the world of air transportation and its regulation as a senior airline executive, an academic and a government official. He retired from Northwest Airlines in 1999 to return to academic life.

Background 
Levine held a BA degree from Reed College (1962) and an LLB degree from Yale Law School (1965). He did graduate work in economics at Yale and the University of Chicago.

Airline executive 
As an airline executive, Levine served at Continental Airlines (1981–82) and Northwest (1992–99) as an Executive Vice President and was President and CEO of New York Air (1982–84), guiding that post-deregulation airline to its first profit. At Northwest, he was principally responsible for the commercial strategy and activities of the company, and for developing and executing Northwest's pioneering alliance strategy, including its joint venture with KLM and its alliance with Continental.  At Continental, he had similarly broad responsibilities and was principally responsible for the realignment of its Micronesian system to serve Japan.

Academic 
As an academic, he was an early advocate of interdisciplinary studies in law and economics and political science.  A student of Nobel laureate Ronald H. Coase at the University of Chicago and of Robert H. Bork, Ward S. Bowman and Friedrich Kessler at Yale, Levine established an innovative program in law and social sciences at Caltech and U.S.C., while holding professorships at both institutions. He served as Dean of the Yale School of Management (1988–92) and held professorial chairs at Caltech (1973-1984_, Yale (1987-1992) and USC. He has also been a member of the law faculties at Harvard (1999–2002) and Yale (2002–2005) and has been an academic visitor at MIT, the London School of Economics, the Interdisciplinary Center of Hertzliya Israel, the University of Virginia and Duke University.  Levine has done pioneering research on airline deregulation, on the application of market mechanisms to airport congestion, on committees and agendas and on the origins of regulation, regulatory capture, and the behavior of regulatory agencies.  His 1965 Yale Law Journal article using the superior performance of the California intrastate airline system to advocate deregulation of the Federal system was the first modern publication to advocate airline deregulation. Levine and this article were among the important sources relied on by then-professor Stephen M. Breyer <> when organizing the 1975 hearings on airline deregulation for Senator Edward M. Kennedy.  It was extensively cited by Alfred E. Kahn  <> in his monumental treatise on regulation Alfred E. Kahn, The Economics of Regulation (1971)and prompted Kahn to name Levine the senior staff person at the Civil Aeronautics Board when he became Chairman in 1977 with a mandate to deregulate to the maximum extent possible.

Government 
As a government official, Levine was instrumental in bringing about airline deregulation. In 1978 and 1979, he served as General Director, International and Domestic Aviation, (the senior staff position at the U.S. Civil Aeronautics Board) and devised many of the mechanisms and practices used to deregulate the industry. He also served as a member of the Aviation Safety Commission, established by Congress in 1986 to evaluate airline safety since deregulation.

Recognition 
Levine  received recognition of his work.  He was named among the ten most influential pioneers in the history of commercial aviation by Airfinance Journal, has received the Transportation Research Foundation’s Distinguished Transportation Researcher award for lifetime achievement, and was the recipient of the Civil Aeronautics Board’s Distinguished Service Award.

Controversy 
Levine's deanship generated some controversy that was covered fairly extensively by the media. When Levine became dean, Yale's SOM was unable to attract a dean with a national reputation. President Schmidt was under pressure from the Yale Corporation to change it or close it.  He recruited Levine, a regularly appointed holder of a professorial chair who was already a member of the SOM faculty, as dean.  Together they made changes that infuriated some faculty, although they were supported by others.  The aggrieved faculty and some student and alumni supporters protested the changes publicly.

Death 

Levine died February 3, 2017.

References 

1941 births
Living people
American airline chief executives
Harvard Law School faculty
New York University faculty
Yale Law School alumni
Yale Law School faculty
Duke University faculty
Reed College alumni